VY Pyxidis is a BL Herculis variable (type II Cepheid) in the constellation of Pyxis.  It ranges between apparent magnitudes 7.13 and 7.40 over a period of 1.23995 days.  Located around 826 light-years distant, it shines with a luminosity approximately 46 times that of the Sun and has a surface temperature of

References

Pyxis (constellation)
Pyxidis, VY
BL Herculis variables
F-type giants
Durchmusterung objects
043736
076296